Giuseppe Angelini (21 October 1810, Ascoli Piceno - 8 June 1876) was an Italian bishop. He was appointed Auxiliary Bishop of Rome and titular archbishop of Corinthus on 21 December 1868, and also served as Council Father to the First Vatican Council.

Sources
http://www.catholic-hierarchy.org/bishop/bangg.html

1810 births
19th-century Italian Roman Catholic titular archbishops
1876 deaths